Miguel Quesada Velasco (born 18 September 1979 in Sabadell, Catalonia) is a Spanish middle distance runner. He specializes in the 800 metres.

Quesada finished fifth at the 2006 European Athletics Championships and won the silver medal at the 2007 European Athletics Indoor Championships.

Participating in the 2004 Olympics, he finished third in his heat, failing to progress to the semifinals.

His personal best time is 1:45.58 minutes, achieved in July 2008 in Barcelona.

Competition record

External links

1979 births
Living people
Spanish male middle-distance runners
Athletes from Catalonia
Athletes (track and field) at the 2004 Summer Olympics
Athletes (track and field) at the 2008 Summer Olympics
Olympic athletes of Spain
21st-century Spanish people